Sariego (Asturian: Sariegu) is a municipality in the Autonomous Community of the Principality of Asturias, Spain. It is bordered on the north by Gijón and Villaviciosa, on the east by Villaviciosa, Nava and Cabranes, on the south by Siero and Nava, and on the west by Siero. The source of the Nora River is within the municipality.

The principal holidays are that of Santiago (the weekend before July 25) and San Pedrín de la Cueva (the third Sunday in August).

The principal monuments of Sariego are the churches of Santiago el Mayor, San Román, and Santa María de Narzana, all of which are constructed in a Romanesque style. The Palacio de los Vigil Quiñones, erected in the 16th century, is also notable.

Toponymy

The decree 116/2005 of November 17, 2005, published in the December 2 Boletin Oficial del Principado de Asturias (BOPA; official bulletin of the Principality of Asturias) granted the Asturian forms of the municipal place names official status for all uses, except for Lamasanti/Llamasanti, which maintains its bilingual name. Therefore, with this exception, the Asturian names are the only ones which can appear on road signs and official maps.

Parishes
Narzana
San Román
Santiago

See also
Church of Santiago de Sariego

References

External links
Federación Asturiana de Concejos 

Municipalities in Asturias